Daniel Geale (born 26 February 1981) is an Australian former professional boxer who competed from 2004 to 2016. He held the unified WBA (Super) and IBF middleweight titles between 2011 and 2013, and the IBO middleweight title from 2007 to 2009. As an amateur boxer, Geale won a welterweight gold medal at the 2002 Commonwealth Games.

Early life

Born in Launceston, Tasmania, Geale is of mixed British and Aboriginal ancestry.

Amateur career
Other than winning the 2002 Commonwealth Games at welterweight, Geale also represented his native country at the 2000 Summer Olympics.  He lost in the first round to Italy's Leonard Bundu. He was an Australian Institute of Sport scholarship holder.

Amateur highlights
2000 Olympic Games in Sydney, Australia as a welterweight:
Lost to Leonard Bundu (Italy) 2:4
2001 East Asian Games in Osaka, Japan:
Defeated Naoki Hirata (Japan) +12-12
Lost to Gennady Golovkin (Kazakhstan) 3-15
2002 Commonwealth Games in Manchester, won Gold Medal:
Defeated Tsetsi Davis (Jamaica) rsf
Defeated Tony Cesay (Sle) 25-13
Defeated Daniel Codling (New Zealand) 27-13
Defeated Kwanele Zulu (South Africa)
2002 Boxing World Cup in Astana, Kazakhstan:
Lost to Mustafa Karagollu (Turkey)
Lost to Yudel Jhonson (Cuba) RSC 2
2003 World Championships in Bangkok, Thailand
Lost to Bakhtiyar Artayev (Kazakhstan) 8-30

Professional career
Geale turned pro in 2004, knocking out Danny Bellert in the third round.  He then went on to build a record of 17 bouts for 17 wins with 12 KO's. On 14 December 2007, Geale fought for the IBO Middleweight Championship of the world against another undefeated Australian, Daniel Dawson, who was 29-0-0 with 20 KO's coming into the fight.  Geale outclassed Dawson over 12 rounds to win the IBO Middleweight title with the judges scoring the bout 120-110, 120-110 and 119-109.

In June 2008, Geale defended his IBO Middleweight Championship with another 12 round unanimous decision over Geard Ajetovic. In December 2008, Geale faced Daniel MacKinnon in a non-title bout.  Geale was down in the 8th, McKinnon was down in the 4th, 6th & twice in the 8th, Geale won a unanimous decision with judges scoring the bout 100-87, 100-87, 100-88. In March 2009 Geale defeated Ian MacKillop with a first-round knockout but in May of that year he lost his next fight in a controversial split decision to former WBA super middleweight champion Anthony Mundine to lose his IBO middleweight title. Mundine later stated that he hardly studied Geale during his training camp for the fight. Geale however, would rebound from the controversial defeat with 3 wins including an IBF Eliminator setting himself up for a world title shot.

IBF middleweight champion
In May 2011, Geale defeated Sebastian Sylvester in Germany by split decision (scores of 118-110, 118-112, 110-118) to become the new IBF middleweight world champion. In August 2011, he made his first successful title defense against contender Eromosele Albert, winning by unanimous decision. Geale made his second successful IBF title defense by defeating Ghana's Osumanu Adama via unanimous decision (scores of 118-110, 117-111, 115-113) on 7 March 2012.

Unified middleweight champion
On 1 September 2012 Geale defeated long time WBA champion Felix Sturm in Oberhausen, Germany via split decision (scores of 116-112, 116-112, 112-116), thus unifying the WBA title with his already held IBF title .

Geale's reign as unified champion was short-lived, as two months after winning the WBA title, he was stripped of it for choosing to fight Anthony Mundine in a rematch over mandatory challenger Gennady Golovkin. Geale was punished for Sturm's refusal to fight mandatory challengers when he was champion. When Geale won the title, the WBA gave him four-and-a-half months instead of the regular nine to defend against the mandatory - in this case Golovkin. Their reasoning was that their mandatory challengers had been ignored for too long.

Geale vs. Mundine II
On 30 January 2013 Geale beat Anthony Mundine in a unanimous points decision (scores of 116-112, 117-111, 117-111) at the Sydney Entertainment Centre to retain his IBF middleweight world title.
Immediately after ring announcer Jimmy Lennon Jr. read out the result, Mundine and his entourage stormed out of the ring and left the arena.

Geale vs. Barker
On 17 August 2013, Geale fought British fighter Darren Barker for Geale's IBF Middleweight world title in Atlantic City. Despite knocking down Barker in the sixth round, Geale lost in a split-decision.

Geale vs. Golovkin
In what was billed as the biggest night of his career and taking place in the legendary Madison Square Garden, Geale lost by TKO in the third round to the Kazakh Gennady Golovkin. Entering the fight as the clear underdog with Golovkin listed by most bookmakers as the 14 to 1 favourite and despite having fought, according to Golovkin "like a champion", Geale was clearly outclassed by Golovkin when during the final exchange Golovkin counterpunched Geale after Geale had connected with a right to the Kazakh's head.

Professional boxing record

References

External links

Daniel Geale - Bujutsu Martial Arts Centre

1981 births
Living people
Indigenous Australian boxers
Boxers at the 2000 Summer Olympics
Boxers at the 2002 Commonwealth Games
Olympic boxers of Australia
Commonwealth Games gold medallists for Australia
Sportspeople from Launceston, Tasmania
Australian Institute of Sport boxers
Indigenous Australian Olympians
International Boxing Federation champions
World Boxing Association champions
International Boxing Organization champions
Indigenous Tasmanian people
Australian male boxers
Commonwealth Games medallists in boxing
Light-middleweight boxers
Super-middleweight boxers
World middleweight boxing champions
Welterweight boxers
Medallists at the 2002 Commonwealth Games